Avaldsnes is a former municipality in Rogaland county, Norway. The  municipality existed from 1838 until 1965 when it was dissolved.  The area was an ancient centre of power on the west coast of Norway and is the site of one of Norway's more important areas of cultural history.  The administrative centre of the municipality was the village of Avaldsnes.  The municipality encompassed the area surrounding the Førresfjorden and the area surrounding the central part of the Karmsundet strait, plus the central part of the island of Karmøy.  Today, the area is part of the municipalities of Tysvær and Karmøy.

History
The parish of Avaldsnæs was established as a municipality on 1 January 1838 (see formannskapsdistrikt). On 16 August 1866, the village of Kopervik (in Avaldsnæs) was declared to be a town.  Towns could not be part of another municipality, so Kopervik was separated from Avaldsnes to become a municipality of its own. This left Avaldsnes with 4,735 inhabitants.  On 1 January 1909, the rural area around surrounding the town of Kopervik was separated from Avaldsnes to form the new municipality called Kopervik herred (later called Stangaland).  This left Avaldsnes with 3,213 inhabitants.

On 1 January 1965 Avaldsnes was dissolved due to the recommendations of the Schei Committee.  The area of Avaldsnes was divided and merged into the municipalities of Karmøy and Tysvær. All of Avaldsnes located west of the Førresfjorden (population: 4,153) was merged with the municipalities of Skudenes, Torvastad, Åkra and with the towns of Kopervik and Skudeneshavn to form the new municipality of Karmøy.  The rest of Avaldsnes located east of the Førresfjorden, consisting of the districts of Førre, Gismarvik, and Stegaberg (population: 994), was merged with Tysvær municipality.

Government
All municipalities in Norway, including Avaldsnes, are responsible for primary education (through 10th grade), outpatient health services, senior citizen services, unemployment and other social services, zoning, economic development, and municipal roads.  The municipality is governed by a municipal council of elected representatives, which in turn elects a mayor.

Municipal council
The municipal council  of Avaldsnes was made up of 21 representatives that were elected to four year terms.  The party breakdown of the final municipal council was as follows:

See also
List of former municipalities of Norway

References

Karmøy
Tysvær
Former municipalities of Norway
1838 establishments in Norway
1965 disestablishments in Norway